The University of Seville (Universidad de Sevilla) is a  university in Seville, Spain. Founded under the name of Colegio Santa María de Jesús in 1505, it has a present student body of over 69.200, and is one of the top-ranked universities in the country.

History
The University of Seville originally dates to the 15th century. Created by Archdeacon Maese Rodrigo Fernández de Santaella, it was originally called Colegio de Santa Maria de Jesus, and was confirmed as a practicing university in 1505 by the papal bull of Pope Julius II. Today, the University of Seville is known for research in technology and science.

In the middle of the 13th century, the Dominicans, in order to prepare missionaries for work among the Moors and Jews, organised schools for the teaching of Arabic, Hebrew, and Greek. To cooperate in this work and to enhance the prestige of Seville, Alfonso the Wise in 1254 established "general schools" (escuelas generales) of Arabic and Latin in Seville. Alexander IV recognized this foundation as a generale litterarum studium by the Papal Bull of 21 June 1260 and granted its members certain dispensations in the matter of residence. Later, the cathedral chapter established ecclesiastical studies in the College of San Miguel. Rodrigo Fernández de Santaella, archdeacon of the cathedral and commonly known as Maese Rodrigo, began the construction of a building for a university in 1472; in 1502 the Catholic Monarchs published the royal decree creating the university, and in 1505 Julius II granted the Bull of authorization; in 1509 the college of Maese Rodrigo was finally installed in its own building, under the name of Santa María de Jesús, but its courses were not opened until 1516. The Catholic Monarchs and the pope granted the power to confer degrees in logic, philosophy, theology, and canon and civil law. The colegio mayor de Maese Rodrigo and the university proper, although housed in the same building, never lost their separate identities, as is shown by the fact that, in the 18th century, the university was moved to the College of San Hermenegildo, while that of Maese Rodrigo remained independent, although languishing.

Influence
The influence of the University of Seville, from the ecclesiastical point of view, was considerable, though not equal to that of the Universities of Salamanca and of Alcalá. Renowned alumni include Sebastián Antonio de Cortés, Riquelme, Rioja, Luis Germán y Ribón, founder of the Horatian Academy, Juan Sánchez, professor of mathematics at San Telmo, Martín Alberto Carbajal, Cardinal Belluga, Cardinal Francisco Solís Folch, Marcelo Doye y Pelarte, Bernardo de Torrijos, Francisco Aguilar Ribón, the Abate Marchena, Alberto Lista, and many others who shone in the magistracy, or were distinguished ecclesiastics. The University of Seville had a great influence on the development of the fine arts in Spain. In its shadow the school of the famous master Juan de Mal Lara was founded, and intellects like those of Fernando de Herrera, Juan de Arguijo, and many others were developed, while literary and artistic clubs were formed, like that of Francisco Pacheco, which was a school for both painting and poetry. During the period of secularization and sequestration (1845–57) the University of Seville passed into the control of the State and received a new organization.

At the same time that the royal university was established, the Universidad de Mareantes (university of sea-farers) was developed. Here, the Catholic Monarchs established the Casa de Contratación by a royal decree of 1503, with classes for pilots and seamen, and courses in cosmography, mathematics, military tactics, and artillery. This establishment was of incalculable importance, for it was here that the expeditions to the Indies were organised, and the great Spanish mariners were educated. This form of polytechnic school, which, according to Eden, Bourné, and Alexander von Humboldt, had taught a great deal to Europe, fell into decay in the 17th century, following the fortunes of Spanish science.

Equality, liberty, justice and pluralism
The university enjoys the independence afforded by self-governance, which gives it a certain flexibility that may work to advantage in the hiring of professors and lecturers. The ancient motto of the university is: "Equality, Liberty, Justice and Pluralism".
The university's stated mission is to educate students who will do the research and development necessary to scientific and technological innovation. This is reflected in the number of degrees offered; students attending the university have a choice of 65 different subjects and one of the widest ranges of academic and sporting facilities in Spain, making it a popular university for both Spanish and international students. In 2004 it had 73,350 students spread on different campuses, being second in number of students among Spanish universities.

Campus internationalisation
Since 1994, North American exchange students have been able to take classes taught by University of Seville faculty members in Spanish in the Faculty of Philology and the Faculty of Geography and History. As of Fall 2009, the university has agreements with 15 international organizations including the Council on International Educational Exchange, the College Consortium for International Studies, International Studies Abroad, SUNY New Paltz and Wells College. and St. John's University. The University of Seville has had a partnership with the Real Colegio Complutense at Harvard University since 2015.

Organization

The University of Seville comprises:
 Governed by the Department Council (Consejo de Departamento): The Departments
 Governed by Centre Council (Junta de Centro): consists of
 Faculties,
 Technical Sciences Schools (Escuelas Técnicas Superiores), and
 University Schools (Escuelas Universitarias).

The main building of the University of Seville is known as the "Old Tobacco Factory", named for its original use. Built in the 18th century, Seville's tobacco factory was the largest industrial building in the world at the time and remained a tobacco factory until the 1950s. This beautiful building is also the setting for the renowned opera, Carmen, by Bizet. Carmen was a fictional worker in the tobacco factory, the original story being a novella by Prosper Mérimée. This building houses two of the university's faculties: the School of Literature and Philology, and the School of Geography and History.

Other campuses and faculties are located throughout Seville, including the Health Science schools in La Macarena, the Business School in Nervion, the Engineering School and School of Communications in La Cartuja and the Languages Institute (Instituto de Idiomas) and Science Schools in Romina

Library
The library holds about 777,000 volumes.

Notable people
 José María de Azcárate, art historian, author, professor, and academic researcher, specializing in medieval Castilian art and Renaissance sculpture.
 Luis Cernuda, poet
 Francisco Elías de Tejada y Spínola, philosophy of law professor
 Baltasar Garzón, judge
 Felipe González, former Prime Minister of the Spanish Government
 Alfonso Guerra, former Deputy Prime Minister of the Spanish Government
 Mark D. Levine, New York City Council member
 Raquel Martínez Rabanal, radio and television hostess
 Manuel Olivencia, professor and lawyer
 Pedro Salinas, professor and poet
 Stephen Sommers, American writer and director

See also

 List of early modern universities in Europe

References

External links

  
 University of Seville at Google Maps, Rectorado campus.
 

 
1505 establishments in Spain
Buildings and structures in Seville
Education in Seville
Educational institutions established in the 1500s
Engineering universities and colleges in Spain
Universities in Andalusia
Universities and colleges in Spain